Bracho is a Spanish surname and can refer to the following people:

Alejandro Bracho (born 1955), Mexican actor
Ángel Bracho (1911–2005), Mexican engraver and painter
Carlos Bracho (born 1937), Mexican actor and writer
Coral Bracho (born 1951), Mexican poet
Diana Bracho (born 1944), Mexican actress
Gabriel Bracho (1915–1995), Venezuelan artist
José Bracho (1928–2011), Venezuelan baseball player
Julio Bracho (1909–1978), Mexican film director and screenwriter
Silvino Bracho (born 1992), Venezuelan baseball player
Carlos Augusto Bracho González (born 1964), Mexican politician
Edickson Contreras Bracho (born  in 1990), Venezuelan diver
Carlos Mijares Bracho (1930–2015), Mexican architect
Andrea Palma (born Guadalupe Bracho Pérez-Gavilán; 1903–1987), Mexican film and television actress
Juan Antonio de Tagle y Bracho (1685–1750), Spanish-born Peruvian aristocrat

Spanish-language surnames